Fred Homburg (born February 4, 1962) is a former Dutch professional ice hockey defenceman.

Homburg spent his entire pro career with his hometown Nijmegen Tigers. He joined the senior first team of Nijmegen in 1978 as a 16-year-old and remained with the club to 2000.

International
He competed as a member of the Netherlands men's national ice hockey team at the 1981 World Ice Hockey Championships.

Sources
 

1962 births
Living people
Dutch ice hockey defencemen
Nijmegen Tigers players
Sportspeople from Nijmegen